Denigastrura is a genus of springtails in the family Hypogastruridae. There is at least one described species in Denigastrura, D. tetrophthalma.

References

Further reading

 
 
 

Poduromorpha
Springtail genera